Leptacis is a genus of parasitoid wasps belonging to the family Platygastridae.

The genus has cosmopolitan distribution.

Species:
 Leptacis abdomintor Fouts
 Leptacis acanthia Buhl, 2005

References

Platygastridae
Hymenoptera genera
Taxa named by Arnold Förster